Raana  is a 2022 Indian Kannada-language romantic drama film written and directed by Nanda Kishore, and produced by Gujjal Purushotham under Gujjal Talkies banners. The film stars Shreyas Manju and Reeshma Nanaiah in pivotal roles. The music is composed by Chandan Shetty. Raana was released on 11 November 2022 and received mixed reviews from critics.

Plot 
Raana (Shreyas Manju), an aspiring police officer, is hustling as a cab driver in Bengaluru. His world revolves around his girlfriend Priya (Reeshma Nanaiah) and a few friends as he awaits a document clearance from the police department. Kapali (Mutant Raghu) and Soori (Mohan Dhanraj) are the city dons. When Kapali gets attacked mysteriously, it leaves Soori enraged and on the lookout for the culprit. Raana accidentally gets caught in the crossfire.

Cast 
Shreyas Manju as Raana an aspiring police officer 
Reeshma Nanaiah as Priya
Mohan Dhanraj as Soori
Kote Prabhakar as Pachchi
Samyuktha Hegde as a dancer (Special appearance in the Song "Malli Malli")

Release
The film was released on 11 November 2022 in theatres.

Home media 
The satellite and digital rights were sold to Udaya TV anad Sun NXT.

References 

Indian drama films
2020s Kannada-language films
2022 films
Films shot in Karnataka
2022 drama films